Joy is the sixth studio album by American soul musician Isaac Hayes. The album was released in October 1973 by Stax Records' Enterprise imprint.

The album peaked at No. 16 on the Billboard 200.

Critical reception
In its obituary of Hayes, the Los Angeles Times called the title track "epic" and "maybe the most sensual outing he ever recorded."

Track listing 
All tracks composed by Isaac Hayes; except where indicated

Personnel
Isaac Hayes - vocals, male vocals arrangements
Isaac Hayes Movement, The Memphis Strings, The Movement Horns - accompaniment 
Hot Buttered Soul Unlimited - backing vocals
Pat Lewis - female vocals arrangements
Johnny Allen - arrangements

References

Isaac Hayes albums
1973 albums
Albums produced by Isaac Hayes
Stax Records albums